The  was a limited express sleeper train service operated by Japanese National Railways (JNR) and later by West Japan Railway Company (JR West), which ran from  to  in Yamaguchi Prefecture, Japan.

The Asakaze was discontinued from the start of the revised timetable on 1 March 2005.

Rolling stock

History
In October 1970, Tokyo to Shimonoseki Asakaze services were also introduced, and the Tokyo to Hakata services were discontinued in December 1994.

The remaining Asakaze services were discontinued in 2005, with the final runs occurring on 28 February.

See also
 List of named passenger trains of Japan
 Blue Train (Japan)

References

West Japan Railway Company
Named passenger trains of Japan
Night trains of Japan
Railway services introduced in 1956
Railway services discontinued in 2005